This is a complete list of Estonia women's  international footballers – women's association football players who have played for the Estonia women's national football team.

Players
Caps and goals updated as of 7 October 2018, after the match against Luxembourg.

Reports for matches played against Latvia on 25 September 1998 and on 15 July 2000, and Lithuania on 26 September 1998 and on 16 July 2000 are incomplete.

See also
Estonia women's national football team results
List of Estonia international footballers

References

External links
 

 
Estonia
International footballers
 
Football in Estonia
Association football player non-biographical articles